The Toi Toi Cup is a season-long cyclo-cross competition, formerly known as the Budvar Cup, consisting of 8 rounds throughout the season in the Czech Republic. It is one of six season-long competitions, alongside the UCI Cyclo-cross World Cup, Cyclo-cross Superprestige, the X²O Badkamers Trophy (formerly known as the DVV Trophy, before that the BPost Bank Trophy and before that as the Gazet van Antwerpen trophy), the EKZ CrossTour and the Ethias Cross.

Winners

Women

References

Cyclo-cross races
Cycle races in the Czech Republic
Recurring sporting events established in 2001
2001 establishments in the Czech Republic